Flins may refer to
Flins (mythology), god of death in Wendish mythology
Flins-sur-Seine, French commune in Yvelines
Flins-Neuve-Église, French commune in Yvelines
Flins Renault Factory, car factory at Flins-sur-Seine